Illinichernes is a genus of pseudoscorpions in the family Chernetidae. There are at least two described species in Illinichernes.

Species
These two species belong to the genus Illinichernes:
 Illinichernes distinctus Hoff, 1949
 Illinichernes stephensi Benedict & Malcolm, 1982

References

Further reading

 

Chernetidae
Articles created by Qbugbot